Alex or Alexander Turner may refer to:

 Alex Turner (born 1986), English singer-songwriter and guitarist for the Arctic Monkeys and The Last Shadow Puppets
 Alex Turner (director) (born 1971), American film director
 Alexander Turner (slave), Virginian slave who escaped at the beginning of the American Civil War and fought in the Union army, and father of Daisy Turner
 Alexander Buller Turner (1893–1915), British soldier in World War I
 Alexander Turner (jurist) (1901–1993), New Zealand lawyer and judge
 Alexander Turner (judoka), American judoka